The 2000 Hungarian Grand Prix (formally the XVI Marlboro Magyar Nagydíj) was a Formula One motor race held on 13 August 2000 at the Hungaroring, in Mogyoród, Pest, Hungary with a crowd of 120,000 spectators in attendance. It was the twelfth of seventeen races in the 2000 Formula One World Championship and the 18th Hungarian Grand Prix. Mika Häkkinen, driving a McLaren-Mercedes car, won the 77-lap race starting from third position. Michael Schumacher finished second in a Ferrari, having started from pole position by setting the fastest overall lap time in the one-hour qualifying session the day before the race proper, with Häkkinen's teammate David Coulthard third.

Before the event, Michael Schumacher was leading the World Drivers' Championship from Häkkinen while Ferrari were ahead of McLaren in the World Constructors' Championship. Häkkinen beat Schumacher and Coulthard off the start line and went on to lead every lap, except for the first round of pit stops. The Finn's eventual margin of victory was eight seconds, with Schumacher holding off Coulthard for second. The win, Häkkinen's third of the season and the 17th of his Formula One career, promoted him to the lead of the World Drivers' Championship for the first time in the season, two points ahead of Schumacher and six ahead of Coulthard, while McLaren took the lead of the World Constructors' Championship by one point from Ferrari with five races remaining in the season.

Background
The 2000 Hungarian Grand Prix was the twelfth of the seventeen races of the 2000 Formula One World Championship and was held at the  clockwise Hungaroring in Mogyoród, Pest, Hungary on 13 August 2000. Sole tyre supplier Bridgestone brought the Soft and the Extra Soft dry compound tyres to the Grand Prix, the softest compounds that were available to teams. Going into the race, Ferrari driver Michael Schumacher led the World Drivers' Championship with 56 points, ahead of McLaren teammates Mika Häkkinen and David Coulthard, who were tied for second on 54 points. Rubens Barrichello of Ferrari was fourth with 46 points while Benetton's Giancarlo Fisichella was fifth on 18 points. In the World Constructors' Championship, Ferrari were leading with 102 points, four ahead of the second-placed McLaren team. Williams were third with 22 points and Benetton were fourth with 18 points. BAR were in fifth position on 12 points.

There were six teams that tested at the Circuit Ricardo Tormo from 3 to 5 August. McLaren test driver Olivier Panis was fastest on the first day, ahead of Häkkinen. Pedro Diniz's Sauber car was afflicted with an oil leak, limiting his team's testing time as the leak was repaired. Coulthard was fastest on the second day. Fisichella set the fastest times on the final day of testing. His Benetton teammate Alexander Wurz spun off and collided with the tyre barrier. His car's wishbone struck his right leg and was taken to the circuit's medical centre before a transfer to a local hospital. Wurz was passed fit to compete in the race the day after his accident. Ferrari opted to spend five days testing at the Fiorano Circuit, concentrating on car development, practice starts, aerodynamic testing and race distance simulations with their test driver Luca Badoer. He was joined by Barrichello on the second day and Michael Schumacher from the fourth day onwards. Badoer and Michael Schumacher spent two more days at the circuit performing shakedowns of the Ferrari F1-2000 car.

After consecutive retirements in the previous three races which included first lap collisions in Austria and Germany, Michael Schumacher said that his objective in Hungary was to avoid any incidents on the first lap and to finish in a points-scoring position. He was also confident that Ferrari would perform well at the circuit. Barrichello revealed that he received backing from Ferrari president Luca di Montezemolo to challenge for more victories and the championship despite the latter's comments to the press about Barrichello assisting Michael Schumacher's title aspirations.

Eleven teams (each representing a different constructor) with two drivers each entered the Grand Prix and there were no changes from the season entry list. Prost's Jean Alesi was passed fit in the days leading up to the race by his doctors and then by FIA medical delegate Sid Watkins following tests. At the previous race, Alesi was involved in an high-speed accident with Sauber driver Diniz, suffering from abdominal pains, dizziness and vomiting. Prost had their test driver Stéphane Sarrazin ready to replace Alesi if he relapsed. Alesi said he felt ready to race again: "It took a few days before I really started to recover, but now I sleep and feel much better".

Some teams made technical changes to their cars for the Grand Prix. The characteristics of the Hungaroring circuit requires teams to run their cars with a high load of aerodynamics and attention was placed onto dissipating heat since high temperatures were recorded at the circuit. McLaren introduced a revised aerodynamic for their MP4/15 chassis, aimed at increasing the amount of downforce, and therefore grip, produced by the bodywork. They also brought revised nose wings. McLaren also strengthened the car's steel rear suspension wishbones. BAR fitted their cars with one-off components that were produced to help optimise the performance of the monocoque's cooling systems. Minardi arrived with new radiator intakes and exits to rectify temperature issues with their Fondmetal V10 engines.

Practice
There were four practice sessions that were held before the Sunday race—two one-hour sessions on Friday, and two 45-minute sessions on Saturday. The Friday practice sessions took place in dry and hot weather conditions; track temperature lowered later on when clouds covered the circuit but ambient temperature remained consistent throughout. Nearly 20 minutes passed before any lap times were set as 15 drivers completed out-laps to allow them to conduct systems checks. The track was dirty due to a lack of activity for several months and race organisers were unable to completely clean the circuit.

Michael Schumacher waited for other drivers to clean the dirty track and set the first session's fastest time on his first quick lap, at 1 minute and 20.198 seconds, in the final moments of the session. He was almost six-tenths of a second faster than teammate Barrichello. Jaguar's Eddie Irvine was third fastest, ahead of Williams' Ralf Schumacher. Fisichella, BAR driver Jacques Villeneuve, Jordan's Jarno Trulli, Diniz, Mika Salo of Sauber and Williams' Jenson Button completed the top ten. The two McLaren set no lap times during the session, opting to conserve their tyre usage. The session saw several teams focused on testing the high downforce aerodynamic packages fitted to their cars.

In the second practice session, Coulthard set the day's quickest lap of 1:18.792 with approximately 15 minutes of the session left; The time was half a second slower than teammate Häkkinen's pole lap at the 1999 Grand Prix. Häkkinen was second fastest. The two Ferrari drivers were third and fourth—Michael Schumacher ahead of Barrichello. Trulli was running quicker finishing fifth fastest, ahead of Fisichella and Williams drivers Ralf Schumacher and Button. Heinz-Harald Frentzen for the Jordan team and Irvine followed in the top ten. Several drivers lost control of their cars during the session due to the low grip racing surface appearing to be problematic for racers. Pedro de la Rosa of the Arrows team was uninjured in a collision with the tyre wall.

The weather remained dry, hot and sunny for the two Saturday practice sessions, with no indication of rain when the third session began. Barrichello was fastest in the third practice session, with a time of 1:18.268 that was set with three minutes remaining. Coulthard was second fastest and was one thousands of a second slower than Barrichello. Frentzen set the third fastest time, ahead of Michael Schumacher in fourth, and Häkkinen and Ralf Schumacher in fifth and sixth. Salo, Button, Trulli and Fisichella took the final top ten places. De La Rosa almost lost control of his car at the final turn three minutes into the session and the engine in Gastón Mazzacane's Minardi car failed due to a differential fault.

The final practice session was held on a circuit that was slightly drier but still dusty than the preceding session. Teams finalised car setups and scrubbing their tyres. Michael Schumacher lapped faster than he had done the day before and went fastest at 1:17.395 with 20 minutes of the session remaining. He was 0.630 seconds quicker than second-placed Coulthard with Barrichello third in the second Ferrari. Frentzen set the fourth fastest time, narrowly faster than Ralf Schumacher. Häkkinen, Trulli, Fisichella, Salo and Diniz followed in positions six through ten. Diniz was briefly stuck at the entry to the pit lane due to his engine stalling while in first gear.

Qualifying
Saturday's afternoon one hour qualifying session saw each driver was limited to twelve laps, with the starting order decided by their fastest laps. During this session, the 107% rule was in effect, which necessitated each driver set a time within 107 per cent of the quickest lap to qualify for the race. The session was held in dry and clear weather conditions, similar to practice but with a warmer track temperature. The hot conditions made the track more slippery. A majority of the fastest teams used new sets of rear tyres and front scrubbed compounds to reduce understeer when lapping fast. Michael Schumacher qualified on pole position for the 28th time in his career, and his fifth of the season, with a lap time of 1:17.514, which he set on his first fast lap midway through qualifying. He was joined on the front row of the grid by Coulthard, who was 0.372 seconds slower than Michael Schumacher's pace on his third and his last run. McLaren did not optimise Coulthard's vehicle to run with a low amount of fuel and had an oversteer in the first two sectors of the circuit. Häkkinen, third, made significant changes to the setup of his car by adjusting the rear anti-roll bar and the front torsion beams he tested early in qualifying to discover if it improved his performance. Ralf Schumacher used the newer Williams qualifying engine and achieved his best qualifying performance of the season in fourth. He said he was pleased with revisions to his car's aerodynamics. Barrichello, fifth, had car handling difficulties and said Coulthard prevented him from lapping faster. Frentzen, sixth, had excess oversteer in the track's final two sectors. 

Fisichella qualified seventh and he said Michael Schumacher slowed his final run. Ferrari attempted to inform Schumacher about Fisichella behind him but Ferrari technical director Ross Brawn pressed the wrong radio button and mistakenly told Barrichello. Brawn apologised for the error and Benetton technical director Pat Symonds downplayed it. Button was the slower of the two Williams drivers in eighth. Salo took ninth and attributed this to cloud cover coming during his last run. Irvine placed tenth. Wurz in 11th failed to qualify in the top ten by two-tenths of a second after switching to his teammate Fisichella's setup. Trulli qualified 12th after experiencing oversteer that could not be rectified by car component and setup changes. He was ahead of Diniz in 13th who was slowed by traffic and had difficulty setting up his vehicle. Alesi was the faster of the two Prost drivers in 14th. De La Rosa took 15th on the soft compound tyre and was the highest qualifying Arrows driver. Villeneuve was 16th after his BAR chassis was unable to produce sufficient amounts of downforce. Johnny Herbert, 17th for Jaguar, experienced excess oversteer and he spun late in the session. He was followed by Zonta in 18th who had a lack of downforce. Nick Heidfeld switched to the spare Prost AP03 car for his fourth run and he reported excess oversteer en route to qualifying 19th. Jos Verstappen, 20th, was unable to adapt to the high-downforce circuit in his Arrows car. The Minardi drivers qualified their underpowered cars in 21st and 22nd; Marc Gené outqualified his teammate Mazzacane by two-tenths of a second after the latter went wide onto the grass during his fastest lap and lost nearly half-a-second.

Qualifying classification

Warm-up

The drivers took to the track in hot and sunny weather at 09:30 Central European Summer Time (UTC+2) for a 30-minute warm-up session. The circuit was cleaned by rainfall the evening before. Teams used the session to adjust and check their race and spare cars before the race. Coulthard went fastest with ten minutes to go with a lap of 1:19.261. The Ferrari cars were second and third—Michael Schumacher quicker than his teammate Barrichello and was 0.120 seconds slower than Coulthard. Ralf Schumacher was fourth in his Williams car. Häkkinen set the fifth-fastest time, 1.2 seconds slower than his teammate Coulthard, due to him encountering traffic on his best lap. Frentzen was the last of the top six fastest drivers. Coulthard drove one installation lap in the spare McLaren alongside the start-finish straight in an effort to clean up his grid position on the right-hand side of the track. Irvine entered the pit lane with smoke billowing from his car due to an engine failure.

Race

The race started before 120,000 spectators, (with 30,000 from Finland), at 14:00 local time. It was warmer than the morning's warm-up session and drivers were required to consume a large amount of water to cope with the physical demands of cockpit temperatures and the circuit. Every driver except for De La Rosa began on the extra soft tyre compounds. Whilst the grid was forming up, Mazzacane had a gearbox problem and he was required to start in his spare car. Herbert also planned to use his spare car as his regular car developed a leak which was fixed before the start. When the event began, Coulthard made a slow start on the dirty section of the track. His teammate Häkkinen had more momentum than Michael Schumacher and steered right to pass him on the inside for the lead at the first corner while coming close to the right-hand side kerb. Michael Schumacher slowed to avoid a collision with Häkkinen and stopped himself retiring from the first lap for the third successive race. 

Coulthard withstood Ralf Schumacher's attempts to overtake him for third place on the inside through turns one and two. Heading into the chicane, Villeneuve and De La Rosa collided and both cars sustained damage. Villeneuve made a pit stop for a new front wing assembly followed by De La Rosa for a new set of tyres since he sustained a left rear puncture. At the first lap's conclusion, Häkkinen led from Michael Schumacher, Coulthard, Ralf Schumacher, Barrichello, and Frentzen. Michael Schumacher was close behind Häkkinen but not enough to effect an overtake for the race lead. Häkkinen began to pull away from Michael Schumacher, increasing his lead to 3.5 seconds by the eighth lap. Fisichella in seventh place was driving with a poor brake balance and ran wide onto the grass at the first turn on lap eight due to a lack of grip. This caused Button to slow slightly in order to avoid a collision. Irvine used this incident to pass Button for seventh position on the short straight into the second corner. Fisichella fell to 14th place. Fisichella ran wide into a gravel trap on lap 12 and he was passed by Herbert for 13th position. On lap 15, Fisichella made his first pit stop for repairs to his car's brakes and rejoined the Grand Prix in 19th position. Alesi became the race's first retirement on that lap after a series of pit stops by mechanics to try and rectify a broken left-rear suspension that was worsened by a change in wheel alignment proved unsuccessful.

Häkkinen's lead over Michael Schumacher was more than seven seconds by lap 19. Coulthard was a further three seconds behind Michael Schumacher due to an incorrect tyre pressure setting and was pulling away from Ralf Schumacher. Heidfeld became the race's second retirement when he stalled because of an decrease in the battery voltage after he made a pit stop after completing 22 laps. Three laps later, Irvine made his first pit stop from seventh position and dropped to 11th. Brawn asked Michael Schumacher to enter the pit lane for the first of two scheduled stops at the conclusion of lap 27 and was stationary for 7.3 seconds. He rejoined the race in fifth position, behind his teammate Barrichello. On the 29th lap, Barrichello relinquished third to teammate Michael Schumacher at the first corner. Barrichello entered the pit lane on the 30th lap and the stop took 6.7 seconds to finish. He returned to the circuit in sixth, ahead of Ralf Schumacher.

Race leader Häkkinen, whose drink battle failed around a third in the race, took his pit stop on lap 31 for a new set of tyres and he fell behind his teammate Coulthard after being stationary for seven seconds. Häkkinen regained the race lead after Coulthard's his 6.9 second pit stop for fuel and tyres on the following lap. Coulthard returned to the circuit in third position, behind Michael Schumacher and ahead of Schumacher's teammate Barrichello. Häkkinen set the race's fastest lap, a 1:20.028 on lap 33, as he continued to increase his lead over Michael Schumacher. Fisichella retired when his car became too difficult to drive due to bargeboard damage on the 36th lap. Coulthard, who was on a new set of tyre compounds, was two seconds behind Michael Schumacher by lap 37 as Schumacher controlled his pace by being circumspect to preserve his tyres. 

Michael Schumacher increased the gap when Coulthard lost more than a second, the result of being held up by Genè on lap 47; Genè would be issued a 10-second stop-go penalty for delaying Irvine's Jaguar. As he had been short-fuelled, Barrichello made his second pit stop on lap 48 and the stop lasted 8.7 seconds. Michael Schumacher and Ralf Schumacher made their pit stops on lap 51. Michael Schumacher was brought into the pit lane since slower cars were likely to impede Coulthard. On the following lap, Coulthard responded by making his second pit stop that lasted 6.6 seconds and he rejoined the Grand Prix in third position, close behind Michael Schumacher. Häkkinen made his final pit stop on the 53rd lap and remained in the lead, having built a lead of 21 seconds over Michael Schumacher. Frentzen became the last driver to make a scheduled pit stop on lap 56. At the end of lap 57, with the scheduled pit stops completed, the top six in the running order was Häkkinen, Michael Schumacher, Coulthard, Barrichello, Ralf Schumacher, and Frentzen. Herbert spun while battling Villeneuve for 13th position. 

Diniz stopped his car between turns nine and ten with an engine failure on lap 65. Herbert fell behind Verstappen on lap 70 after spinning at the first corner in front of Verstappen. He retired two laps later with gearbox problems. Mazzacane pulled off the track on lap 73 with an engine failure after a visor became lodged inside a radiator and made water temperatures go too high. Trulli closed up to Button and passed him for seventh at the first corner on lap 75. Button lost eighth to Irvine one lap later. Button was slowed by a fractured engine exhaust or a throttle control issue reducing the amount of available horsepower to him in the final laps. Michael Schumacher finished second 7.9 seconds behind, ahead of Coulthard in third. Ralf Schumacher took fifth and Frentzen completed the points scorers in sixth. Trulli, Irvine, Button, Salo and Wurz filled the next five positions albeit one lap behind the race winner. Villeneuve, Verstappen, Zonta, Gené and De La Rosa were the final classified finishers. There were six retirements during the Grand Prix.

Post-race

The top three drivers appeared on the podium to collect their trophies and in the subsequent press conference. Häkkinen stated that his good start was instigated by modifications made to his car's engine. His win was praised by the Vice President of Mercedes-Benz Motorsport Norbert Haug. "Mika had a great race," he said. "His victory may have looked easy, but it was tough to achieve and in my view this was one of his best drives ever." Michael Schumacher said that although he was unable to catch Häkkinen, he was happy to finish second. He admitted that he was too cautious at the start because he lost momentum and said Häkkinen would have overtaken him during the pit stop phase had he not done so at the start. Coulthard said that he believed that his car's suffered from balance issues before taking his first pit stop which accounted for his lack of pace. He also added that spending time behind back-markers during the second stint hindered his attempts to overtake Michael Schumacher but admitted that third position was the best possible result he could have achieved.

After Ferrari's victory at the previous race, Brawn said that "Our pitstops and our race strategy went well, but we just weren't quick enough.", while Di Montezemolo urged the mechanics and engineers of Ferrari to concentrate on rectifying the issue of wheel-spin and also praised Häkkinen for his recent trend of good starts. Barrichello said that he blamed his poor qualifying performance for his fourth-place finish. Ralf Schumacher and Frentzen were pleased to finish in fifth and sixth places respectively. Fisichella, who retired from the race with a brake problem, said that the reoccurring issue caused damage to his car and forced his later retirement. Gené placed blame upon faulty radio communication to his team as the reason for his stop-go penalty and said that he did not receive the blue flag until the last moment. Jaguar's technical director Gary Anderson was angry with Gené after the race as he believed the Spaniard's driving cost Irvine the chance to finish in a points-scoring position. "I don't understand why the blue flags weren't waved because it was plain for all to see." said Anderson.

As a consequence of the final results of the Grand Prix, Häkkinen took the lead of the World Drivers' Championship, on 64 points, for the first time in the 2000 season. Michael Schumacher lost the lead of the Drivers' Championship, falling two points behind Häkkinen. Coulthard maintained third place with 58 points, nine points ahead of Barrichello in fourth and forty-one in front of Fisichella in fifth position. In the Constructors' Championship, McLaren became the new leaders of the World Constructors' Championship with 112 points, demoting Ferrari on 111 points to second position. Williams ijn third increased the gap to Benetton in fourth to 6 points, with Jordan's one point scored by Frentzen finishing sixth allowing the team to pass BAR for fifth on 12 points. Despite McLaren taking the lead of both championships, their team principal Ron Dennis acknowledged that he expected both his drivers would have the advantage in the most of the five remaining races although he believed that being complacent would reduce McLaren's chances of success.

Race classification
Drivers who scored championship points are denoted in bold.

Championship standings after the race 

Drivers' Championship standings

Constructors' Championship standings

References

Hungarian Grand Prix
Hungarian Grand Prix
Grand Prix
Hungarian Grand Prix